Power of Africans Unity (PAU) is a South African political party founded in November 2016 by former COPE and UDM member Julius Nsingwane.

The party launched in Kroonstad, and joined demonstrations calling for the removal of then-president Jacob Zuma.

Election results

National elections

|-
! Election
! Total votes
! Share of vote
! Seats 
! +/–
! Government
|-
! 2019
| 2,685
| 0.02%
| 
| –
| 
|}

Provincial elections

! rowspan=2 | Election
! colspan=2 | Eastern Cape
! colspan=2 | Free State
! colspan=2 | Gauteng
! colspan=2 | Kwazulu-Natal
! colspan=2 | Limpopo
! colspan=2 | Mpumalanga
! colspan=2 | North-West
! colspan=2 | Northern Cape
! colspan=2 | Western Cape
|-
! % !! Seats
! % !! Seats
! % !! Seats
! % !! Seats
! % !! Seats
! % !! Seats
! % !! Seats
! % !! Seats
! % !! Seats
|-
! 2019
| - || -
| 0.06% || 0/30
| 0.01% || 0/73
| - || -
| 0.03% || 0/49
| - || -
| - || -
| - || -
| - || -
|}

References 

2016 establishments in South Africa
Political parties in South Africa
Political parties established in 2016